Karramomus is a locality in the Goulburn Valley region of Victoria, Australia.

References

External links

Towns in Victoria (Australia)
City of Greater Shepparton